The  Morava Offensive Operation, was undertaken by the Bulgarian First Army between 14 October 1915 and 9 November 1915 as part of the strategic offensive operation of Army Group Mackensen against Serbia in 1915. Under the command of Lieutenant General Kliment Boyadzhiev the Bulgarians seized the fortified areas of Pirot, Niš and the valley of the river Morava. As a result, the Serbian forces were compelled to retreat towards Kosovo and Metohija.

In the beginning due to the harsh weather, strong resistance of the defenders and the tough terrain the Bulgarian advance was slow but because defenders were greatly outnumbered, there was a Bulgarian breakthrough near Pirot in 10 days and the Serbs retreated to the Timok.

The battle continued for 27 days and the Bulgarians penetrated up to 90 km deep into the Serbia's territory. The Serbs lost 6,000 men; 60 guns and a large amount of military equipment.

Footnotes

Sources
 
Атанас Пейчев и колектив, 1300 години на стража, Военно издателство, София 1984.

Morava
Morava
Morava
Conflicts in 1915
1915 in Bulgaria
1915 in Serbia
October 1915 events
November 1915 events